Prunella laciniata, the cutleaf selfheal, is a plant in the family Lamiaceae.

References

laciniata
Taxa named by Carl Linnaeus